Club Natació Atlètic-Barceloneta (CNAB) is a Spanish water polo club from Barcelona, established in 1913.

The club is the result of the merge of Club Natació Atlètic, founded in 1913, and Barceloneta Amateur Club, founded in 1929 and renamed later on as Club Natació Atlètic-Barceloneta (CNAB). The club is located in the coastline neighbourhood of Barceloneta.

Atlètic-Barceloneta is one of the most successful water polo clubs in Spain, having won 21 league titles, 17 national cups and 15 national super cups. The team has also won the LEN Champions League in 2014.

Honours
International
LEN Champions League (1)
2013–14
LEN Super Cup (1)
2014
National
Spanish Championship (1)
1973
Spanish League (22)
1969–70, 1972–73, 1973–74, 2000–01, 2002–03, 2005–06, 2006–07, 2007–08, 2008–09, 2009–10, 2010–11, 2011–12, 2012–13, 2013–14, 2014–15, 2015–16, 2016–17, 2017–18, 2018–19, 2019–20, 2020–21, 2021–22 
Copa del Rey (18)
2000, 2001, 2004, 2006, 2007, 2008, 2009, 2010, 2013, 2014, 2015, 2016, 2017, 2018, 2019, 2020, 2021, 2022
Supercopa de España (15)
2001, 2003, 2004, 2006, 2007, 2008, 2009, 2010, 2011, 2013, 2015, 2016, 2017, 2018, 2019
Regional
Copa de Cataluña (9)
2006–07, 2007–08, 2008–09, 2009–10, 2010–11, 2012–13, 2013–14, 2014–15, 2016–17

References

External links
Official website

Water polo clubs in Catalonia
Sports clubs in Barcelona
Sports clubs established in 1913
1913 establishments in Spain